Covington Township is the name of some places in the U.S. state of Pennsylvania:
Covington Township, Clearfield County, Pennsylvania
Covington Township, Lackawanna County, Pennsylvania
Covington Township, Tioga County, Pennsylvania

Pennsylvania township disambiguation pages